Jake Bensted (born 4 March 1994) is an Australian judoka. He won a bronze medal at the 2014 Commonwealth Games and competed at the 2016 Summer Olympics, where he was eliminated in the second bout.

References

1994 births
Living people
Australian male judoka
Olympic judoka of Australia
Judoka at the 2016 Summer Olympics
Commonwealth Games medallists in judo
Commonwealth Games bronze medallists for Australia
Judoka at the 2014 Commonwealth Games
20th-century Australian people
21st-century Australian people
Medallists at the 2014 Commonwealth Games